Silkworth is a census-designated place (CDP) in Lehman Township, Luzerne County, Pennsylvania, United States. The population was 820 at the 2010 census.

Geography

References

Census-designated places in Luzerne County, Pennsylvania
Census-designated places in Pennsylvania